Black Market Gardening is an album by the British electronica group Fila Brazillia, released on Pork Recordings in 1996.

Track listing
"Obrigado" – 3:53
"Snake Ranger" – 7:55
"Little Dipper" – 6:01
"Blubber Plinth" – 7:37
"Butter My Mask" – 9:14
"Wigs, Bifocals And Nurishment" – 8:08
"Xique-Xique" – 6:48
"Onc Mongaani" – 9:22
"July 23" – 5:14

References 

1996 albums
Fila Brazillia albums